MCL Restaurant & Bakery, formerly known as MCL Cafeterias, is a chain of American cafeteria-style restaurants based in Indianapolis. As of April 2022 there are 13 locations in Illinois, Indiana, and Ohio.

Background
The company began with a single cafeteria in Indianapolis, Indiana, in 1950, founded by Charles O. McGaughey and George Laughner. MCL is an abbreviation of their two names. Today, the chain operates locations in Indiana, Illinois and Ohio. It is a privately owned company, now exclusively owned by the McGaughey family. In 2007, MCL Cafeterias changed the brand to "MCL Restaurant and Bakery", although no fundamental changes were made in production. MCL competed with Laughner's Cafeteria, which was founded by a cousin.

See also
List of cafeterias

References

External links
 Company website

Companies based in Indianapolis
Restaurants in Indianapolis
Economy of the Midwestern United States
Regional restaurant chains in the United States
Restaurants established in 1950
Cafeteria-style restaurants
1950 establishments in Indiana